Wilhelm Krautwaschl (born 5 March 1963) is an Austrian Roman Catholic prelate. He is bishop of Graz-Seckau.

References

1963 births
Bishops of Graz-Seckau
Living people
Place of birth missing (living people)
21st-century Austrian Roman Catholic priests